S. Unnikrishnan Nair is an Indian aerospace engineer presently serving as the director of Vikram Sarabhai Space Centre (VSSC). He is known for his works in the field of launch vehicle design, Space Capsule Recovery Experiment (SRE), and Human Spaceflight Programme. Prior to his directorship of VSSC, he was Director of Human Space Flight Centre, Bengaluru. He is also currently holding the additional charge of the Director, Indian Institute of Space Science and Technology.

Early life and education 

S. Unnikrishnan Nair was born to Sreedharan Nair, who was an employee at the Kottayam Survey Office, and Rajamma.

Nair received his B.Tech. degree in Mechanical Engineering from Kerala University, ME in Aerospace Engineering from IISc, Bengaluru, and Ph.D. in Mechanical Engineering from IIT Madras, Chennai.

Career
Nair joined VSSC in 1985.

Personal life
S. Unnikrishnan Nair is married to Jaya G Nair, a former Computer Engineer at VSSC. The couple have two daughters.

Awards and honors 
 ISRO Team Excellence Award for his contributions to SRE.

References 

Indian space scientists
People from Kottayam
Indian Space Research Organisation people
Living people
Year of birth missing (living people)
IIT Madras alumni
Indian Institute of Science alumni